Posti is a 1950 Indian Punjabi-language film and the first production of Kwatra Production (of Sardul Singh Kwatra and Harcharan Singh Kwatra), directed by K. D. Mehra (Krishan Dev Mehra), starring Majnu and Shyama in the lead roles. Shyama was the principal female actress of this movie.
 It did well at the box office in the Punjab and Delhi areas. Noted playback singer, Asha Bhosle, made her debut with the film.

Music 
The music, composed by Sardul Singh Kwatra, played a major role in the film's success. Sardul modified the folk tunes of Punjab and the songs were hits. Asha Bhosle, Mohammad Rafi, Shamshad Begum, Rajkumari and Jagjit Kaur were the playback singers. Rajkumari first sang for a Punjabi Kurhmai in 1941, but in the film Posti, her songs became real hits. 

Popular songs of the film include "Do Guttan Kar Merian" by Asha Bhosle, "Kajjle Di Paanian Dhaar" by Rajkumari and a duet, "Ja Bhaira Posti" by Mohd. Rafi and Shamshad Begum.

See also 
Bhangra
Lachhi
Do Lachhian

References

External links 

1950 films
Indian black-and-white films
Films set in Punjab, India
Punjabi-language Indian films
1950s Punjabi-language films